Hero of Our Time is a 1966 Soviet drama film directed by Stanislav Rostotsky.

Plot 
The film is an adaptation of the eponymous novel by Mikhail Lermontov.

Cast 
 Vladimir Ivashov as Pechorin (voiced by Vyacheslav Tikhonov)
 Aleksey Chernov as Maksim Maksimovich
 Silvia Berova as  Bela
 Svetlana Svetlichnaya as Undine
 Aleksandr Orlov as Young Officer
 Nikolay Burlyaev as Blind man
 Sofiya Pilyavskaya as Old Woman
 Stanislav Khitrov as Pechorin's Servant
 Boris Savchenko as Yanko

Critical response
Film critic Mikhail Bleiman in Iskusstvo Kino observed:
On the screen, there are simply illustrations for individual episodes of the novel, sometimes simplified, sometimes cinematically embellished. We did not see dramas of a strong character in an insignificant time.

References

External links 
 

1966 films
1960s Russian-language films
Soviet drama films
1966 drama films
Gorky Film Studio films
Mikhail Lermontov
Films based on Russian novels
Films directed by Stanislav Rostotsky